Rainbow BRTS is a bus rapid transit system in the city of Pune. The system is operated by the Pune Mahanagar Parivahan Mahamandal Limited (PMPML). The infrastructure has been developed by the Pune Municipal Corporation & Pimpri Chinchwad Municipal Corporation, Pune. The project currently envisages 113 km of dedicated bus corridors along with buses, bus stations, terminals and intelligent transit management system.

The Rainbow BRTS project is being implemented with the financial support of Jawaharlal Nehru National Urban Renewal Mission (JnNURM) of the Government of India. Additionally, specific components of the project in PCMC limits are being funded under the ‘Sustainable Urban Transport Project’, which is an initiative of the Ministry of Urban Development, Government of India and is supported by The World Bank, UNDP & GEF.

History
Pune was the second city in India to experiment with a bus rapid transit system, after Ahmedabad, which opened the nation's first BRT in 2010. PMPML started plying pilot routes in December 2006.
Most of these buses are not in service currently. The funding for the project came from the Government of India under the Jawaharlal Nehru National Urban Renewal Mission. Total of  route was proposed for Rainbow BRTS. Now regular PMPML buses ply on the Hadapsar-Katraj corridor of BRTS.

The Pimpri-Chinchwad BRTS was announced in December 2008, when eight routes covering 112 km were proposed. Construction of the first route was due to be completed within 18 months. By January 2009, 90% of construction work on an 11 km pilot route between Nigdi and Dapodi had been completed. However, a string of disputes between the Pimpri-Chinchwad Municipal Corporation (PCMC), civic administrators and corporators led to the project being delayed, with corporators citing funding difficulties and problems encountered on the similar Delhi BRTS and Rainbow BRTS projects as the causes.

In September 2009 it was announced to the press that, although most work had been completed, difficulties procuring the 650 buses required to run on the system had led to the project being indefinitely postponed. It was also found that the proposed new bus shelters had been due to be installed on the wrong side of the road, leading to delays in their construction, while passenger information systems had yet to be installed. The PCMC stated that this was not a major issue as the shelters could be constructed quickly from prefabricated materials, and that the vehicles would be purchased by December 2009. A month later it was revealed that the cost of the project had overrun by 230 crore, around 50% of the total project cost. By May 2010, funding for the completion of four BRT routes had been agreed, with the remaining four sanctioned by the national government but not yet funded. A number of high-rise buildings along the routes had also been approved for construction.

Both the systems were merged to form Rainbow BRTS which is currently under expansion.

By April 2014 two of the routes were under construction, with the first station near to completion. The first two lines were expected to be operational by the end of March or the beginning of April 2015. The Sangvi-Kiwale corridor (earlier named as Aundh-Ravet corridor) was thrown open to public on 5 September 2015.

Description 

The Rainbow BRT system in Pune and Pimpri Chinchwad, launched in 2015, has features such as:
 Special Rainbow BRT buses with doors on both sides that run in reserved lanes in the BRT corridors
 Bus stations that are covered, closed and located in the median of the dedicated lanes, with access ramps and signage 
 Level Boarding - The bus platform and the BRT station platform are at the same height
 Automatic Doors - Automatic doors on BRT stations and bus doors open when the bus is correctly docked at the station
 Crossings - The crossings from the footpath to the BRT stations have signals at several locations or have speed tables 
 Passenger Information System - Information on bus arrivals is displayed on screens at the bus stations. Buses have display screens and audio announcements. Route numbers are displayed on LED screens on the front, back and the left side of buses
 Intelligent Transit Management System - The BRT Buses have GPS and buses and stations are linked with a BRTS Control Room which tracks bus movement and is able to communicate with the bus drivers.
 Security and Traffic Management- Security personnel are deployed at the bus stations. Traffic Wardens are deployed at signals and crossings to prevent entry of other vehicles (apart from BRT buses and emergency vehicles) into dedicated bus lanes.

Feeder bus routes or regular services are run by PMPML from various locations in the city up to the BRT corridors.

The system will when completed comprise eight routes with a total length of 112 km, with improved street lighting and passenger facilities on the roads used by the system. It will require around 650 buses to operate the complete network. The system will be substantially different from that in neighbouring Pune, with wider roads and grade separation allowing a more substantial network to be constructed.

The buses and bus stops alike are integrated via the Integrated Traffic Management System (ITMS) which enable travellers to know the ETA of the bus. The bus stops and the buses are equipped with automatic doors, that open when they are in close proximity. The bus-stops are easily accessible by a low-gradient ramp on one end. Signals are being installed near the bus stops to enable pedestrians to cross the road.

Features
The features of Rainbow BRT include
Buses - Over 600 special Rainbow BRT buses with doors on both sides and more standing space, that ply smoothly and rapidly in reserved lanes
Bus stations in the BRT Lanes - Covered and provide protection from rain and sun, well lit, have a ramp at the entrance and signage boards with information about the BRT corridors
Tickets at stations - The ticket is to be bought at the ticket counter inside the station before boarding the bus. Smart Cards are proposed in the next phase.(Alternate option of buying from bus conductor is also available.)
Level Boarding - The height of the bus platform and the BRT station platform are at the Doors and Bus Interface same level. Passengers do not have to climb steps to board the bus, a feature similar to metro rail.
Automatic Doors - Automatic doors on BRT stations and bus doors open only when the bus is properly docked at the station
Crossings - The crossings from the footpath to the BRT stations have signals in many locations or have speed tables so that vehicles have to slow down to allow passengers to cross safely.
Bus Numbers, Bus Arrival and Station Information - Information on bus arrivals is displayed on screens at the bus stations. Display screens and audio announcements in buses give information about the next stop. Route numbers appear on LED displays on the front, back and the left side of buses
Intelligent Transit Management System - BRT Buses have GPS and all buses and stations are linked with the BRTS Control Room at Swargate which tracks bus movement and gives feedback to drivers to improve service.
Security and Traffic Management - Security personnel are present at each BRT bus station. Traffic Wardens are present at signals and crossings to help in the management of other traffic and prevent entry into dedicated bus lanes.

Routes

Completed
Katraj - Swargate - Hadapsar. (Via Pune-Satara road, Shankarsheth road via Swargate Bus Station - 16.5 km)
 Vishrantwadi - Bombay sappers - Yerwada - Waholi Jakat Naka and Sadalbaba Jn - Patil Estate. (Total = 16 km)

Under Construction
Warje - Kharadi corridor. PMC has taken a lot of efforts to make this one a successful project. The pattern of the bus stops is different than Satara road bus stops. This pattern of bus stops does not create sharp turns on the other lanes like the Satara road BRTS does.

Other Proposed Corridors
Katraj - Kalewadi Phata corridor.
Kothrud - Vishrantwadi corridor.
Dhayari - Hadapsar Gadital corridor.

Other Proposed Roads
Baner Road.
F. C. Road (Officially named as Gokhle road)
J. M. Road
Karve Road
Paud Road
Sinhgad Road
University Road
Samgamwadi Road.
Dhanori Road.
Nehru Road.
Mundhwa Bypass.
Nagar Road.
Airport Road.
Yerawada - Vishrantwadi Road.
Solapur Road
Ramwadi - Vimannagar Road.
Vishrantwadi - Vimannagar Road.
Vishrantwadi - Dhanori Road.
Deccan College - Vimannagar Road

Repair work
In 2012, the PMC started to make changes on the road so that the management of traffic would become easier.
A 1.5 km long flyover was constructed from Padmavati to Bhartividyapeeth, which has 4 lanes, plus the existing 4 lanes.
The legs of the flyover are constructed on the BRTS route. The BRTS has been cancelled.
Apart from the flyover, there are 2 subways constructed at Bibwewadi chowk and Kaka Halwai chowk for the pedestrians to cross.
These three constructions have reduced a lot of time to travel through this route.

Phases

Pilot Phase 
A pilot system was constructed on the Katraj - Swargate - Hadapsar corridor and operations began in December 2006. At a time when 'BRT' acronym was new to India and there was limited nationwide understanding of requirements for such an advanced public transport system, Pune was the first city in India to implement and operationalise a high capacity bus system on two corridors:  
 Swargate–Hadapsar (East‐West Corridor) – 10.2 km
 Swargate–Katraj (North‐South Corridor) – 5.8 km

The infrastructure and operations was an improvement over the regular bus services while many features which are intrinsic to a Bus Rapid Transit System were not a part of it. The infrastructure components included widening  of roads, construction of footpaths and cycle tracks, laying of municipal services like water supply and drainage lines, utility ducts, construction of BRT lane‐segregators, bus stops, installation of Passenger Information System, etc. The Ministry of Urban Development, Government of India provided financial support for the project.

However, with the construction of 3 flyovers along the route, the pilot corridor has now been interrupted at various points and the use of the dedicated lane discontinued.

Phase 1 
Six corridors are being developed in the current phase of the Rainbow BRTS network.

See also 
 Pune Monorail
 Pune Metro
 Pune Metropolitan Area
 Pune Railway Station
 Lohegaon Airfield

References

Sources
Map_Corridors.pdfRainbowBrtPune

External links
 Rainbow BRTS
 BRTS finally flagged off
 Sangamwadi-Vishrantwadi Route to become operational today
 BRTS pilot to run on Sunday 
 Pune becomes first city in India to have BRT system
 From the bus to tickets, BRT's first run finds many fans 
 On day three, a smooth ride for BRTS 
 BRTS work on other roads begins 
 Pune's BRT stumbles at the start
 Link to Bus Rapid Transit Newsletter for Jan 2007

Bus rapid transit in India
Proposed bus rapid transit in India
Transport in Pimpri-Chinchwad
Transport in Pune